Sonya Clark (born 1967, Washington, D.C.) is an American artist of Afro-Caribbean heritage. Clark is a fiber artist known for using a variety of materials including human hair and combs to address race, culture, class, and history. Her beaded headdress assemblages and braided wig series of the late 1990s, which received critical acclaim, evoked African traditions of personal adornment and moved these common forms into the realm of personal and political expression. Although African art and her Caribbean background are important influences, Clark also builds on practices of assemblage and accumulation used by artists such as Betye Saar and David Hammons.

Biography 
Clark's father was a psychiatrist from Trinidad while her mother was a nurse from Jamaica. Clark was influenced by the craftspeople in her family, including a grandmother who worked as a tailor, and a grandfather who was a furniture maker.

Education 
Clark holds an MFA from Cranbrook Academy of Art and in 2011 was honored with their first Distinguished Mid-Career Alumni Award.  She has a BFA from the Art Institute of Chicago where she studied under the artist Nick Cave (performance artist) and a BA in psychology from Amherst College in 1989, where she also received an honorary doctorate in 2015. She graduated from the Sidwell Friends School in 1985.

Clark cites professor Rowland O. Abiodun, Amherst College as an early influence in her studies of the connection between her Caribbean culture and Yoruba culture, which was further enhanced by a post-graduation trip to the Ivory Coast, where she learned to weave on a hand loom. Clark also cites Nick Cave as instrumental in furthering her investigations in fiber.

Professional academic career 
Clark is a professor of art in the department of Art and the History of Art at Amherst College. Between 2006 and 2017, she was chair of the Craft/Material Studies Department and was honored as a Distinguished Research Fellow. In 2016, she was awarded a university-wide Distinguished Scholars Award at the highly acclaimed School of the Arts at Virginia Commonwealth University in Richmond, VA. The department is ranked by U.S. News & World Report as one of the top in the nation. Prior to her appointment at VCU, she was Baldwin-Bascom Professor of Creative Arts at the University of Wisconsin-Madison, where she received tenure with distinction and an H.I. Romnes award.

Art career 

Clark's work has been exhibited in over 450 museums and galleries in Europe, Africa, Asia, Australia, and throughout the Americas.  Her work is in the collection of many museums including the Indianapolis Museum of Art, Delaware Art Museum, Philadelphia Museum of Art, the Madison Museum of Contemporary Art, and Memphis Brooks Museum.  Her work has been favorably reviewed in journals such as Art in America, The New York Times, Sculpture, Surface Design Journal, The Los Angeles Times, Fiber Arts, New American Paintings, Philadelphia Inquirer, Italian Vogue, Hyperallergic, Mother Jones, and Huffington Post.

Sonya Clark was an artist in residence at the McColl Center for Art + Innovation in 2011. She has received several awards including an Anonymous Was a Woman Award, a United States Artists Fellowship, Pollock-Krasner Award, a Rockefeller Foundation Residency in Italy, an Art Matters Grant, Red Gate Residency in China, a Wisconsin Arts Board Fellowship, a Virginia Museum of Fine Arts Fellowship, a Virginia Commission for the Arts Fellowship, a Civitella Ranieri Fellowship in Italy, an 1858 Award for Contemporary Southern Art from the Gibbes Museum, the 2014 ArtPrize a Juried Grand Prize co-winner and recipient of the Juried award for Best Two-Dimensional work, and a Smithsonian Artist Research Fellowship. Clark was inducted into the American Craft Council College of Fellows in 2020.
Her work can be found in many books including Wrapped in Pride, Mami Wata, Hand + Made, The Global Africa Project, Second Lives, Manufractured, Material Girls, Contemporary Black Women Artists,Pricked, African American Art and Artists, Choosing Craft, and Master: bead-weaving Her work, Monumental,, was acquired by the Smithsonian American Art Museum as part of the Renwick Gallery's 50th Anniversary Campaign.

Hair Craft Project 
According to Clark, "Hairdressers are my heroes. The poetry and politics of Black hair care specialists are central to my work as an artist and educator. Rooted in a rich legacy, their hands embody an ability to map a head with a comb and manipulate the fiber we grow into a complex form. These artists have mastered a craft impossible for me to take for granted." She claims, "hair is power," and, "as carrier of DNA, hair holds the essence of identity."

"I grew up braiding my hair and my sister's hair, so in one sense, like many black women, I had been preparing to be a textile artist for a very long time."

Clark further considered the hair strand as a tool for communication and worked with graphic designer Boquin Peng to create an alphabet based on the curl pattern of her hair called Twist.

Flag Project 
Clark's explorations with flags began with her thesis Kente Flag Project in 1995. This work is a mixture of elements from African and Western/American culture. She weaves Kente patterns into the design for strength and endurance, advancement and achievement, and prosperity.

Since 2009, Clark has created serial projects surrounding the Confederate Battle Flag. She has performed Unraveling in June 2015 at the now-defunct Mixed Greens gallery in New York City and then at the Nasher Museum of Art at Duke University, in October 2016. Her more resent presentation of the exhibit in Louisville Kentucky "was the first performance under the current presidential administration and since the country has found itself embroiled in debate over the presence and ramifications of Confederate imagery in the wake of the violence in Charlottesville, Virginia, this past summer." "The act is now a part of a larger movement through which state and local governments are dismantling these objects out of a sense of civic duty." During the exhibition, members of the audience are encouraged to join Clark one at a time in the unraveling of a confederate flag while she explains her vision and demonstrates how to pull the strands of the flag apart. According to Goodman, "Clark stands side-by-side by participants, shoulder-to-shoulder as they pull each strand of the flag and confront the reality it represents". In April 2018, Clark returned to her alma mater, Amherst College, to perform "Unravelling" at the Mead Art Museum.

In 2017, Clark created a hand woven linen cloth reproduction of the white dish towel used by a Confederate soldier to surrender at the Appomattox Court House on April 9, 1865.  This piece is known as "Monumental Cloth (sutured)". It is the artist's hope that this flag of truce becomes as well known as the Confederate Battle Flag. Both "Unravelling" and "Monumental Cloth (sutured)" were on display at the Mead Art Museum from April 5, 2018, to July 1, 2018.  Clark reproduced the Truce Flag with the intention of drawing attention back to the flag that brokered and to the Civil War, questioning why symbols of white supremacy, such as the Confederate Battle Flag, are memorialized in favor of symbols of peace. A larger immersive outgrowth of the project "Monumental Cloth: the Flag We Should Know" was made in collaboration with and exhibited at The Fabric Workshop and Museum Her 450 square foot enlarged replica of the truce flag used for the Confederate surrender at Appomattox, Virginia, "Monumental", is in the permanent collection of the Smithsonian American Art Museum's Renwick Gallery.

Exhibition history 
 2021: Sonya Clark: Tatter, Bristle, and Mend, National Museum of Women in the Arts, March 3 – June 28 
 2019: Monumental Cloth: the flag we should know, Fabric Workshop and Museum, March 29 – August 4, 2019
 2019: Sonya Clark: Hair|Goods, An Homage to Madam CJ Walker, Goya Contemporary Gallery, January 25 - March 30, 2019
 2017: Oaths and Epithets: Works by Sonya Clark, Contemporary Craft, April 12 – August 19, 2017
 2015: Loving After Lifetimes of All This, The Center for Craft, Creativity & Design, January 30 – May 23, 2015
 2008: Sonya Clark: Loose Strands, Tight Knots, Walters Art Museum, June 28 – September 2, 2008

Published works 

 Haystack Monograph Series No. 17, 2004: Craft and Design. "Hand-me-downs: Our Stories held in Objects, Materials and Processes."
 Surface Design, Fall 2003. "In Review: Nick Sargent."
 Surface Design, Summer 2000. "Beneath Pattern: Investigating Symmetry."
 Ornament, Spring 1997. "Sculptural Headdresses."
 The Hair Craft Project: Sonya Clark, eds. Melissa Anderson, Sonya Clark, Meg Roberts and Leigh Suggs, Exhibition Catalogue, 2015

References

External links
 
 Hair art
 Hand+Made: The Performative Impulse in Art and Craft, Contemporary Art Museum, Houston
Manufractured: The Conspicuous Transformation of Everyday Objects, Chronicle Books
Manufractured: The Conspicuous Transformation of Everyday Objects, Museum of Contemporary Craft Exhibition

1967 births
Living people
American textile artists
African-American contemporary artists
American contemporary artists
Artists from Washington, D.C.
20th-century American women artists
Women textile artists
Amherst College alumni
Yoruba women artists
American people of Trinidad and Tobago descent
American people of Yoruba descent
Amherst College faculty
Yoruba women academics
American people of Jamaican descent
African-American women artists
Cranbrook Academy of Art alumni
School of the Art Institute of Chicago alumni
American women academics
University of Wisconsin–Madison faculty
Virginia Commonwealth University faculty
American art educators
Sidwell Friends School alumni
21st-century American women artists
Fellows of the American Craft Council
20th-century American artists
21st-century American artists
20th-century African-American women
20th-century African-American people
20th-century African-American artists
21st-century African-American women
21st-century African-American artists